Queenstown in Western Tasmania has had two railway stations.  The original was built for the railway built for the Mount Lyell Mining and Railway Company, and lasted until the closing of the railway line in 1962.  The newer station was built for the re-built railway, the West Coast Wilderness Railway.

First station (1890s-1962)
The older station was across from the western end of Orr Street, Queenstown and the Empire Hotel, without an extensive covering roof.  It was covered in the 1920s.

The station was a regular point of ceremony for visiting and departing dignitaries, specially during the era when road access was not possible.

2000s station (2000 +)
The 2000s station is located slightly south from the original and is south from the Driffield Street and Orr Streets intersection. It has specifically an all-weather roof and large structure building around the station.

Station sequence
 Queenstown railway station
 Lynchford
 Rinadeena
 Dubbil Barril
 Teepookana
 Regatta Point

Notes

Queenstown, Tasmania
Railway stations in Western Tasmania
West Coast Wilderness Railway